Pseudobryum is a genus of mosses belonging to the family Mniaceae.

Species:
 Pseudobryum cinclidioides (Huebener) T.J. Kop.
 Pseudobryum speciosum (Mitt.) T.J. Kop.

References

Mniaceae
Moss genera